William Pitt the Younger reassumed the premiership of the United Kingdom of Great Britain and Ireland in 1804, succeeding Henry Addington as First Lord of the Treasury and Chancellor of the Exchequer. His second ministry was cut short with his death in 1806.

Cabinet

Changes
January 1805
Lord Mulgrave succeeds Lord Harrowby as Foreign Secretary.
Lord Buckinghamshire (Lord Hobart before November 1804) succeeds Mulgrave at the Duchy of Lancaster.
Lord Sidmouth succeeds the Duke of Portland as Lord President. Portland becomes a minister without portfolio.
April 1805Lord Barham succeeds Lord Melville as First Lord of the Admiralty.
July 1805
Lord Harrowby succeeds Lord Buckinghamshire as Chancellor of the Duchy of Lancaster.
Lord Camden succeeds Lord Sidmouth as Lord President.
Lord Castlereagh succeeds Camden as Colonial Secretary. He remains at the Board of Control.

References

 
 

British ministries
1804 establishments in the United Kingdom
1806 disestablishments in the United Kingdom
1800s in the United Kingdom
Ministries of George III of the United Kingdom
Ministry 2
Cabinets established in 1804
Cabinets disestablished in 1806